Tereza Skoumalová is Česká Miss 2014 for Miss World 2014 was represented her country at the Miss World 2014. She was crowned as the second place at the Česká Miss 2014.

Pageants
Tereza was crowned Miss Czech Republic World at the Ceska Miss 2014 competition on the weekend of March 29–30, 2014.

References

External links

Living people
Czech beauty pageant winners
Czech female models
Miss World 2014 delegates
People from Ostrava
Year of birth missing (living people)